Diamond Peak is a  mountain in the Sierra Nevada on the boundary between Fresno and Inyo Counties, California in the United States. It is on the Sierra Crest. The west side of Diamond Peak is located in Kings Canyon National Park, at the headwater of Woods Creek, and the east side is located in the Inyo National Forest.

References

Mountains of Kings Canyon National Park
Mountains of Fresno County, California
Mountains of Inyo County, California
North American 4000 m summits